MacCrimmon or McCrimmon may refer to:

People
Brad McCrimmon (1959–2011), Canadian professional ice-hockey player
Brenna MacCrimmon; see Crossing the Bridge: The Sound of Istanbul
Katie Kerwin McCrimmon (born 1965), American television reporter
Kevin McCrimmon (born 1941), American mathematician

Other
MacCrimmon (piping family), a Scottish family of pipers to the chiefs of Clan MacLeod
Jamie McCrimmon, a fictional character in the British television series Doctor Who
The Black Bonspiel of Wullie MacCrimmon, a 1951 play by Canadian author W.O. Mitchell

Scottish surnames